Smithtown Central School District is a school district in New York which serves residents in the Smithtown communities of Smithtown, Nesconset, Kings Park, and  Saint James. Parts of neighboring Smithtown communities Ronkonkoma, Lake Ronkonkoma, Hauppauge, and Stony Brook are also served. The Smithtown Central School District is the home of the Smithtown and Saint James LIRR stations. It is the largest school district on Long Island.

Current schools

Elementary schools
The Smithtown Central School District currently operates on seven elementary schools. Grades kindergarten to fifth grade served in Smithtown CSD's elementary schools. The regular Smithtown CSD elementary school day lasts 6 hours and 5 minutes. Bus service from We Transport Inc. and Towne Bus Inc. transports students from home to school and back within an hour from school starting and ending. There are no buses serving the elementary schools at later hours.

The elementary schools contain various clubs for elementary students to join, most before school, some after school. Students receive one teacher throughout the entire day (grades kindergarten to five), except for special classes (i.e. Physical Education, General Music, Art, Library Time).

The elementary schools in the Smithtown CSD are as follows:

Accompsett Elementary School
Branch Brook Elementary School (closed)
Dogwood Elementary School
Mills Pond Elementary School
Mt. Pleasant Elementary School
Nesconset Elementary School (closed)
Smithtown Elementary School
St. James Elementary School
Tackan Elementary School

Middle schools

The Smithtown Central School District serves students through three different middle schools. Grades six to eight are served in these middle schools. The regular Smithtown CSD middle school day lasts 6 hours and 43 minutes, from 7:50am to 2:33pm. Bus service from We Transport Inc. and Towne Bus Inc. transports students from home to school and back within an hour from school starting and ending. Late buses are available for students staying after school for athletic events or other clubs. These buses are condensed from the normal amount and run at 4:10pm and at 5:10pm.

The middle schools contain a number of clubs for middle school students to join, most after school, with some before school. Middle schools in Smithtown contain several academic contests at an interscholastic level. There are athletic teams in Smithtown CSD's middle schools. Teams may be joined automatically or require one to audition in a try out. It is not unusual for a Smithtown sports team to go undefeated in a particular season.

Students follow a bell schedule of a forty-one-minute period, nine-period day. There is a four-minute transition between periods. The school runs on a quarter system, distributing report cards every ten weeks of the 40-week school year. Progress reports are distributed halfway into the ten-week quarter. (Progress reports contain comments that do not go to the final grade of the class as opposed to report cards which contain grades, citizenship markings and comments). The last week of the school year (a 41st week) contains seminars and final exams for these students, including New York State High School Regents Examinations for math and science honors students.

Prior to 1992, the middle schools in the Smithtown CSD were as follows:
Accompsett Middle School
Great Hollow Middle School
Nesaquake Middle School

In 1992, redistricting led to the consolidation of the three middle schools into Smithtown Middle School, a facility housed in the former and now present Smithtown High School East, containing all sixth, seventh and eighth graders in the Smithtown CSD.  The student population grew again, which caused Smithtown Middle School to be split again, first reopening Great Hollow Middle School and then disbursing the rest of its students to Nesaquake and Accompsett Middle Schools when the high school split back into East and West.

Smithtown High Schools

The Smithtown Central School District serves students through the Smithtown High School on two different campuses, the East Campus in St. James and the West Campus in Smithtown. Grades nine to twelve are served in these high schools. The regular Smithtown CSD high school day lasts 6 hours and 43 minutes, from 7:20am to 2:03pm. Bus service from We Transport Inc. and Towne Bus Inc. transports students from home to school and back within an hour from school starting and ending. Depending upon the budget passed by the citizens, late buses may be available for students staying after school for athletic events or other clubs. These buses are condensed from the normal amount and run at 4:00pm and at 5:00pm.

The high schools contain many clubs for high school students to join, the great majority after school, and a few before school. High schools in Smithtown contain several academic contest interschool clubs, such as Science Olympiad, Political Awareness Club, DECA, and Academic Quiz Bowl. There may be athletic teams in Smithtown CSD's high schools dependent upon the budget. Teams may be walk-on or require a tryout depending on participation.

Students follow a bell schedule of a 40-minute period, nine-period day. There is a four-minute transition between periods. The school runs on a quarter system, distributing report cards every ten weeks of the 40-week school year.  The last weeks of the school year (a 41st and 42nd week) contains and final exams for these students, including New York State High School Regents Examinations required for graduation.

The high schools in the Smithtown CSD are as follows:
Eastern Campus (St. James, NY)
Western Campus (Smithtown, NY)
The nickname for the athletic teams for both high schools is the Smithtown Bulls, a moniker adopted in the 1992 consolidation.  Blue is the primary color for the Western Campus with red as the accent.  Red is the primary color for the Eastern Campus with blue as the accent.  Prior to the consolidation, Smithtown East's teams were known as the Indians and Smithtown West's teams were known as the Knights.  Smithtown East's colors were red and white and Smithtown West's colors were blue and gold.

Former Smithtown schools

New York Avenue Junior High School
The building located at 26 New York Avenue was formerly a junior high school, which served students grades seven through nine. It served the middle-western portion of the Smithtown Central School District. Graduating students of the New York Avenue Junior High School would enter Smithtown High School (West). In its time, the New York Avenue Junior High School operated along with three other junior high schools in the district, Great Hollow Junior High School, Accompsett Intermediate High School and Nesaquake Junior High School. Today it serves its function as the district's central office, adult education programs, and board of education meetings. It is also known as the Joseph M. Barton building.

Smithtown Branch High School
Prior to the opening of Smithtown Central High School building in St. James in 1960, Smithtown High School operated out of the New York Avenue school building.  At some point, before the opening of the Lawrence Avenue Elementary school, the New York Avenue building served as a K through 12 school.

Notable faculty
Walt Whitman taught in the Smithtown school district during 1837 and 1838 in a one-room school house and had 85 students on his roster although at the time attendance wasn't compulsory and the actual attendance was usually much smaller.

Samantha and Richard Specht - Richard taught science at Great Hollow Middle School while Samantha teaches German at Smithtown High School East and Smithtown High School West. After the death of their 22-month-old son, Richard Edwin-Ehmer Specht "Rees" during the fall of 2012, they founded ReesSpecht Life, promoting Random Acts of Kindness. The foundation has distributed 750,000 "Kindness Cards" worldwide.

Mr. Specht is also the published author of the children's book "A Little Rees Specht Cultivates Kindness".  ReesSpecht Life, and its impact on the Smithtown Community and beyond, has been featured on Fox and Friends, Good Day NY, WCBS 2, WPIX 11, News 12 Long Island and Verizon 1, Good Morning America, Yahoo News, and multiple press publications worldwide.

 Jay Beckenstein - founding member of jazz fusion band Spyro Gyra
 Frank Catalanotto - Major League baseball player
 Mickey Conlon - real-estate broker, star of HGTV's Selling New York
 John Curtis - Major League baseball player
 John Daly - 2010 Olympics
 Buck Dharma - Founding member of Blue Öyster Cult
 Ilana Glazer, comedian, co-creator Broad City
 Jodi Hauptman - art historian
 Andrew Levy - ombudsman for Red Eye with Greg Gutfeld
 Jim Mecir - Major League baseball player
 Soledad O'Brien - journalist, host of Matter of Fact with Soledad O'Brien
 Rob Pannell - Professional lacrosse player
 Jodi Picoult - author
 John Reiner - cartoonist, The Lockhorns
 Jai Rodriguez - Queer Eye for the Straight Guy star
 Kyle Stevenson - American Producer / Clothing Designer 
 Jeremy Wall - founding member of jazz fusion band Spyro Gyra
 William Heyen - author, National Book Award Finalist
 James Heinz - hip hop producer
 Matt Yallof - sportscaster

References

External links
 {{Official}|http://www.smithtown.k12.ny.us/}}
New York State Education Department

School districts in New York (state)
Education in Suffolk County, New York